Samuel Adler (December 3, 1809 – June 9, 1891) was a leading German-American Reform rabbi, Talmudist, and author.

Early life
Samuel Adler was born on December 3, 1809 in Worms, Confederation of the Rhine (present-day Germany). He received his early religious education from his father Isaac, who was one of the associate rabbis in Worms and instructed him in Hebrew and the Biblical and Rabbinic literature of the Jews. When Rabbi Isaac Adler died on December 23, 1822, thirteen-year-old Samuel, his four young siblings, and their mother were left in straitened circumstances. In spite of innumerable difficulties and extreme privation, Samuel continued his studies at the yeshivot in Worms and Frankfurt-am-Main, while concurrently pursuing a regular course of classical and general studies at the high schools of those two cities.

After graduating from the Frankfurt Gymnasium, Adler entered, in 1831, the University of Bonn and later that of Gießen, where he studied Oriental languages and philosophy for five years and awarded the Doctor of Philosophy in 1836.

Career
Adler assumed his first official appointment as a preacher and assistant rabbi in Worms. In 1842, he was elected rabbi of the Jewish congregations in Alzey and remained in this position until 1857.

In 1856 Adler removed to United States at New York City, and at the beginning of 1857, he received an offer from Temple Emanu-El, New York to succeed Leo Merzbacher, recently deceased, as the head rabbi of the leading Reform congregation in the United States.  Adler accepted the call and moved to New York in March 1857.  He remained active as the spiritual head of Emanu-El until 1874, when he was made rabbi emeritus and relieved from active work for the rest of his life.  He was succeeded by Gustav Gottheil.  During his tenure, Adler continued the practice of conducting Temple services in German, in preference to the traditional Hebrew, for the congregation that consisted mostly of prosperous German immigrant families.  Adler also revised the German prayer book introduced by Merzbacher. He also authored the bi-lingual A Guide to the Instruction in the Israelitish Religion (Leitfaden für den israelitischen Religionsunterricht) for use in Emanu El's Hebrew Sunday school.

Samuel Adler was not merely a thorough Talmudic scholar, but also had a considerable command of the knowledge of various issues concerning the Jews, including their history, religion, and literature.  Adler was committed to translating his scholarship into social action.

During the twenty-one years of his career in Germany, he campaigned energetically for the emancipation of the Jews from their civil disabilities, especially for the removal of the humiliating and obnoxious oath known as the more judaico.  Adler succeeded in having the Jewish religion taught on equal terms with Protestantism and Catholicism in the lower and higher schools of Worms.  He pushed for the recognition of gender equality within Judaism.  It was through his influence that the mechitza, which had segregated the women from the men in the ancient synagogue of Worms, was leveled, allowing the sexes to sit with each other during services.

Adler gave special attention to the improvement of the religious instruction of the young, both in the city and in the rural schools he supervised.  He made it his aim to enhance the order, the solemnity, and the dignity of the public worship.  He was instrumental in founding a number of new charitable institutions. Above all, with patience and zeal, he persuaded his congregations to let go of the deadening influence of religious literalism. In this endeavor he frequently drew upon the storehouse of his great Talmudic learning for the arguments which he used in his struggle for progress, seeking always to rest the reformation of manners upon a basis of inward conviction, and favoring a gradual transformation rather than an abrupt transition from the old to the new.

He belonged to what may be called the historico-critical school of Jewish theology. He was a highly-respected citizen of New York, keeping in touch with modern thought and progress, and accomplishing a vast amount of good. He contributed scholarly articles to several learned periodicals; for example, Contributions to the History of Sadduceeism, Jewish Conference Papers, and Benedictions. Some of these the author collected and published under the Hebrew title, Kobez 'al Yad (Collections) in 1886, mainly as a souvenir for his friends.

Death and legacy
Adler died on June 9, 1891 in Manhattan, New York, and rested in Salem Fields Cemetery of Brooklyn, New York. His extensive library of rabbinica was donated by his family to Hebrew Union College, Cincinnati.

Family
Adler married Henrietta Frankfurter.
 His son Felix Adler (1851–1933), was the founder of the Society for Ethical Culture.
 His son Isaac Adler was a physician and educator.
 His daughter Sarah Adler Goldman, married to Julius Goldman (1852–1909), German Jew of the Goldman–Sachs family.
 His grand-daughter Hetty Goldman (1881–1972), was one of the first female archaeologists to undertake excavations in Greece and the Middle East.

Notes

Sources

 

Attribution
 
 
 

American Reform rabbis
German Reform rabbis
German emigrants to the United States
American people of German-Jewish descent
University of Bonn alumni
Rabbis from Worms, Germany
1809 births
1891 deaths
People from Rhenish Hesse
19th-century American rabbis